The dicotyledons, also known as dicots (or, more rarely, dicotyls), are one of the two groups into which all the flowering plants (angiosperms) were formerly divided. The name refers to one of the typical characteristics of the group: namely, that the seed has two embryonic leaves or cotyledons. There are around 200,000 species within this group. The other group of flowering plants were called monocotyledons (or monocots), typically each having one cotyledon. Historically, these two groups formed the two divisions of the flowering plants.

Largely from the 1990s onwards, molecular phylogenetic research confirmed what had already been suspected: that dicotyledons are not a group made up of all the descendants of a common ancestor (i.e., they are not a monophyletic group). Rather, a number of lineages, such as the magnoliids and groups now collectively known as the basal angiosperms, diverged earlier than the monocots did; in other words, monocots evolved from within the dicots, as traditionally defined. The traditional dicots are thus a paraphyletic group.

The eudicots are the largest monophyletic group within the dicotyledons. They are distinguished from all other flowering plants by the structure of their pollen. Other dicotyledons and the monocotyledons have monosulcate pollen (or derived forms): grains with a single sulcus. Contrastingly, eudicots have tricolpate pollen (or derived forms): grains with three or more pores set in furrows called colpi.

Comparison with monocotyledons
Aside from cotyledon number, other broad differences have been noted between monocots and dicots, although these have proven to be differences primarily between monocots and eudicots. Many early-diverging dicot groups have monocot characteristics such as scattered vascular bundles, trimerous flowers, and non-tricolpate pollen. In addition, some monocots have dicot characteristics such as reticulated leaf veins.

Classification

Phylogeny
The consensus phylogenetic tree used in the APG IV system shows that the group traditionally treated as the dicots is paraphyletic to the monocots:

Historical
Traditionally, the dicots have been called the Dicotyledones (or Dicotyledoneae), at any rank. If treated as a class, as they are within the Cronquist system, they could be called the Magnoliopsida after the type genus Magnolia. In some schemes, the eudicots were either treated as a separate class, the Rosopsida (type genus Rosa), or as several separate classes. The remaining dicots (palaeodicots or basal angiosperms) may be kept in a single paraphyletic class, called Magnoliopsida, or further divided. Some botanists prefer to retain the dicotyledons as a valid class, arguing its practicality and that it makes evolutionary sense.

APG vs. Cronquist
The following lists show the orders in the Angiosperm Phylogeny Group APG IV system traditionally called dicots, together with the older Cronquist system.

Dahlgren and Thorne systems
Under the Dahlgren and Thorne systems, the subclass name Magnoliidae was used for the dicotyledons. This is also the case in some of the systems derived from the Cronquist system. These two systems are contrasted in the table below in terms of how each categorises by superorder; note that the sequence within each system has been altered in order to pair corresponding taxa

The Thorne system (1992) as depicted by Reveal is:

There exist variances between the superorders circumscribed from each system. Namely, although the systems share common names for many of the listed superorders, the specific list orders classified within each varies. For example, Thorne's Theanae corresponds to five distinct superorders under Dahlgren's system, only one of which is called Theanae.

See also
 Calyciflorae

References

External links

 World list of dicot species (aka Magnoliopsida) from the Catalogue of Life, 253,406 species.
Tree browser for dicot orders, families and genera with species counts and estimates via the Catalogue of Life

Historically recognized angiosperm taxa